Hesper is an unincorporated community in western Yellowstone County, Montana, United States. It is located northeast of Laurel and west of Billings. Hesper appears on the Mossmain U.S. Geological Survey Map.

History
Hesper was established in 1917 as a town adjoining the Hesper ranch and is also the name of the school district. The name Hesper or Hesperus, is the evening star, and according to old mythology, the king of the western land. The name has Masonic roots. The community is named after the Hesper Farm, founded by Ignatius Daniel O'Donnell.

In its heyday, the depot in Hesper served as a hub for surrounding farms and ranchers in the area. However, by the 1940s the town began to lose importance and declined.

Most of the original township itself is no longer in use, with many of the original structures leveled or abandoned. The community is home to the Yellowstone Boys and Girls Ranch and is now considered a subdivision of the Billings Metro Area.

The former Hesper School District is currently the Elder Grove Elementary School District and is still in operation today, serving grades kindergarten through eight.

References

Unincorporated communities in Yellowstone County, Montana
Unincorporated communities in Montana